Gregoire Lake Provincial Park is a provincial park in Alberta, Canada. It is located close to Highway 63, between Fort McMurray and Lac La Biche, on the northern shore of Gregoire Lake.

It was established on October 21, 1969, and is maintained by Alberta Tourism, Parks and Recreation.

Amenities
The park has one overnight camping ground on the shore of Gregoire Lake and an additional day use area.

Activities
The following activities are available in the park:
Beach activities
Birdwatching
Camping
Canoeing/kayaking
Cross-country skiing (10 km non-groomed trails)
Fishing
Group camping
Front Country Hiking
Horseshoes
Ice fishing
Power boating
Sailing
Snowmobiling (on to lake only and on designated snowmobile trails outside the park)
Swimming
Water-skiing
Windsurfing

See also
List of provincial parks in Alberta
List of Canadian provincial parks
List of Canadian national parks

References

External links

Provincial parks of Alberta
Regional Municipality of Wood Buffalo